This is a summary of 1995 in music in the United Kingdom, including the official charts from that year.

Summary
1995 saw a number of changes occur. Céline Dion's "Think Twice", which was released in October 1994 yet took until the end of January to reach the top, was the first UK number 1 single not to be available on vinyl in any form.

Around the middle of the year, the way singles entered the chart started to change. Instead of entering low and climbing up to their peak, singles would now usually enter at their peak, and then fall down the chart. In May, Robson & Jerome became the first British act to reach number 1 with "Unchained Melody", after having sung the song on the ITV programme Soldier Soldier.  In May, music featured in an advertising campaign for Guinness reached number 2 – mambo tune "Guaglione" by Pérez Prado was a massive hit and the advert featured on an accompanying screensaver.

This was also the year which saw Britpop at its most popular. A highly publicised chart battle in August saw Oasis and Blur battling it out for the number 1 position, having both released their singles on the same day. Blur won the singles battle, with "Country House" beating Oasis' "Roll with It" to the top spot, but Oasis, with (What's the Story) Morning Glory?, would go on to greatly outsell Blur's album, the album of which would eventually become the second biggest album in the UK. After a decade in the business Pulp secured a first number one album while Britpop elder statesman Paul Weller also benefited from a return to popular and critical favour.

Singles that went on to sell over a million copies were Coolio's "Gangsta's Paradise", the first rap single to sell over a million in the UK, both of Robson & Jerome's songs ("Unchained Melody" / "White Cliffs of Dover", the biggest selling single of the year, and "I Believe" / "Up on the Roof") and Michael Jackson's "Earth Song". In addition, a second remix of New Order's "Blue Monday" (reaching number 17) pushed sales of that song over a million as well.

In all, there were 17 number one singles in 1995. As the 1990s continued the amount started to increase, and there wouldn't be a total as low as 1995's.

Composer Michael Tippett celebrated his ninetieth birthday on 2 January.  the occasion was marked by special events in Britain, Canada and the US, including the premiere of his final work, The Rose Lake. A collection of his essays, Tippett on Music, was published in the same year.  The other most notable British classical composer of the year was Karl Jenkins, whose album Adiemus: Songs of Sanctuary was released in September to become a huge hit, thanks to the music's exposure in television advertisements.

Events
 January - In a shake up to BBC Radio 1's playlist, controller Matthew Bannister ensures that "old music" (anything recorded before 1990) is dropped from their playlists.
 13 January -  Steve Wright leaves BBC Radio 1, unhappy that his producer had been asked to leave, and because he disagreed with being told what records to play on his morning show.
 1 February - Richey Edwards, guitarist with the Manic Street Preachers disappears.  He would soon be reported as a "missing person", until 2008, when he became legally "presumed dead".
 24 February - Bruno Brookes is sacked from BBC Radio 1, after 11 years, by head of production, Trevor Dann. Brookes' contract, that was due to end in April was not renewed.
 March - Drummer Reni leaves The Stone Roses, just weeks before the band are due to start their Second Coming tour, he is replaced by Robbie Maddix who would remain with the band until the band splits a year later.
 24 April - Chris Evans is new host of BBC Radio 1's breakfast show, replacing Steve Wright.
 30 April - Drummer Tony McCarroll leaves Oasis, following a bust-up, he would be replaced by Alan White
 24 June - The Stone Roses pull out of their headline performance at the Glastonbury Festival, after guitarist John Squire fractures his collarbone in a mountain biking accident.  They are replaced by Pulp who go on in their place.
 17 July - Robbie Williams leaves Take That
 14 August - Blur's single "Country House" and Oasis' single "Roll with It" are released on the same day, leading to a media frenzy that would be tagged as "The Battle Of Britpop".
 20 September - The Daily Mirror accuse Pulp, of promoting drugs with their song "Sorted for E's & Wizz", and call for the single and its inside artwork to be banned.
 2 October - Oasis release their 2nd album (What's the Story) Morning Glory? , it sells a record-breaking 345,000 copies in its first week, making it (at the time) the second-fastest selling album in British history
 6 November - Queen release Made in Heaven, their final studio album, and their last album to include what was Freddie Mercury's final vocals.
 4 December - The Beatles release "Free as a Bird", originally an unreleased demo by John Lennon from 1977 and completed by the surviving Beatles, who incorporated the demo into a studio version.

Charts

Number-one singles

Number-one albums

Number-one compilation albums
{| class="wikitable" style="font-size:97%; text-align:center;"
|-
| Chart date(week ending) || Album
|-
| 7 January || rowspan="3"|Now 29
|-
| 14 January
|-
| 21 January
|-
| 28 January || The Best of Heartbeat
|-
| 4 February || The Best Punk Album in the World...Ever!|-
| 11 February || rowspan="2"|Dance Mania 95 Volume 1
|-
| 18 February
|-
| 25 February || rowspan="3"|On a Dance Tip
|-
| 4 March
|-
| 11 March
|-
| 18 March || Smash Hits 95 Volume 1
|-
| 25 March || rowspan="2"|Dance Zone Level 4
|-
| 1 April
|-
| 8 April || rowspan="2"|Dance Mania 95 Volume 2
|-
| 15 April
|-
| 22 April || rowspan="4"|Now 30
|-
| 29 April
|-
| 6 May
|-
| 13 May
|-
| 20 May || rowspan="3"|On a Dance Tip 2
|-
| 27 May
|-
| 3 June
|-
| 10 June || rowspan="2"|Top of the Pops 1
|-
| 17 June
|-
| 24 June || rowspan="3"|Dance Zone Level 5
|-
| 1 July
|-
| 8 July
|-
| 15 July || rowspan="3"|Dance Mania 95 – Volume 3
|-
| 22 July
|-
| 29 July
|-
| 5 August || The Best Summer...Ever!
|-
| 12 August || rowspan="4"|Now 31
|-
| 19 August
|-
| 26 August
|-
| 2 September
|-
| 9 September || Dance Zone Level 6
|-
| 16 September || rowspan="2"|Help
|-
| 23 September
|-
| 30 September || rowspan="6"|Heartbeat – Forever Yours
|-
| 7 October
|-
| 14 October
|-
| 21 October
|-
| 28 October
|-
| 4 November
|-
| 11 November || The Greatest Party Album Under the Sun
|-
| 18 November || Pure Swing IV
|-
| 25 November || rowspan="6"|Now 32
|-
| 2 December
|-
| 9 December
|-
| 16 December
|-
| 23 December
|-
| 30 December
|}

Year-end charts

Best-selling singles

Best-selling albums

Best-selling compilation albumsNotes''':

Classical music
Sally Beamish – Viola ConcertoHarrison Birtwistle – Panic (premiered at Last Night of the Proms)
Andrew Glover – Fractured VistasMichael Tippett – "Caliban's Song"
Graham Waterhouse – Celtic Voices and Hale Bopp

Opera
Thomas Adès – Powder Her FaceMusical filmsEngland, My England, starring Michael BallPulse, Pink Floyd concert film

Music awards

Brit Awards
The 1995 Brit Awards winners were:

Best British producer: Nellee Hooper
Best soundtrack: Pulp FictionBritish album: Blur: ParklifeBritish breakthrough act: Oasis
British dance act: M People
British female solo artist: Eddi Reader
British Group: Blur
British male solo artist: Paul Weller
British single: Blur – "Parklife"
British Video: Blur – "Parklife"
International breakthrough act: Lisa Loeb
International female: k.d. lang
International group: R.E.M.
International male: Prince
Outstanding contribution: Elton John

Mercury Music Prize
The 1995 Mercury Music Prize was awarded to Portishead – Dummy''.

Births
13 January – Jonathan Antoine, tenor
11 April – Dodie Clark, singer songwriter and musician
14 May – Fox Jackson-Keen, actor, dancer and singer 
23 June – Lauren Aquilina, singer-songwriter and musician
15 July – Elyar Fox, singer
23 July – Faryl Smith, singer
15 December – Leadley, singer-songwriter and musician
19 December – Elliot Evans, singer

Deaths
4 February – David Alexander, singer, 56
12 February – Tony Secunda, music industry manager, 54 (heart attack)
18 February – Denny Cordell, record producer, 51
5 March – Vivian Stanshall, eccentric British musician, 51 (house fire)
7 March – John Lambert, composer, 68
20 March – Ella Halman, opera singer and actress, 98
4 April – Kenny Everett, radio DJ and comedian, 50
9 June – Frank Chacksfield, pianist, organist, composer and arranger, 81
14 June - Rory Gallagher, Irish guitarist, singer, songwriter and producer, 47
1 July – Ian Parkin, guitarist (Be-Bop Deluxe), 45
12 July – Sean Mayes, pianist and writer.
18 August – Alan Dell BBC Radio 2 disc jockey, 71
22 September – Dolly Collins, folk musician, 62
27 September – Christopher Shaw, composer, 71
30 October 
Brian Easdale, composer, 86
Paul Ferris, film composer, 54 (suicide)
31 October – Alan Bush, pianist and composer, 94
4 November – Marti Caine, entertainer, 50 (lymphatic cancer)
17 November – Alan Hull, singer-songwriter and founder of Lindisfarne, 50 (heart thrombosis)
21 November
Peter Grant, music industry manager, 60 (myocardial infarction)
Matthew Ashman, guitarist of Adam and the Ants, Bow Wow Wow, 35
18 December – Brian Brockless, composer, organist and conductor, 69

See also
 1995 in British radio
 1995 in British television
 1995 in the United Kingdom
 List of British films of 1995

References

External links
BBC Radio 1's Chart Show
The Official Charts Company

 
British music
British music by year
20th century in music